Idaeus or Idaios is a given name. People with the name include:

Mythology
 Idaeus, a Trojan, charioteer of Priam
 Idaeus, a Trojan, son of Priam
 Idaeus, a Trojan, the son of Dares
 Idaeus, a son of Dardanus (son of Zeus)
 Idaeus, one of the three sons that Helen of Troy had with Paris (mythology), according to Dictys Cretensis
 Idaeus, an epithet of Zeus
 Idaeus, an epithet of Herakles

History
 Idaeus of Cyrene, Libya, an ancient Greek Olympic winner at foot-race. He won at 275 B.C.
 Idaeus of Rhodes, ancient Greek epic poet
 Idaeus, anyone/anything from or pertaining to Mount Ida

Reference

Greek masculine given names